George Franklin Pawling (April 16, 1879 - December 2, 1954), was President of the Amateur Athletic Union in the 1910s and the builder of the Philadelphia Arena in the 1920s.

Biography
Pawling was born on April 16, 1879, in Lewistown, Pennsylvania. He attended the Central Manual Training School of Philadelphia and graduated in 1896. He went to work for the Pencoyd Iron Works from 1896 to 1900, taking courses in their School of Instruction in Engineering. He studied engineering in Temple College  in Philadelphia. He then worked for the New York Shipbuilding in 1901 to 1902 in charge of the detailing of hulls. From 1903 to 1905 he was the assistant engineer at the Philadelphia Rapid Transit Company where he designed the Market Street Elevated Railway. From 1906 to 1907 he was a contracting engineer for the Belmont Iron Works.

He died on December 2, 1954, at Thomas Jefferson University Hospital in Philadelphia.

References

1879 births
1954 deaths
Presidents of the Amateur Athletic Union
People from Lewistown, Pennsylvania
People from Philadelphia
Temple University alumni